The UnipolSai Tower is an office skyscraper in Milan, Italy.

History 
Construction works began in 2017, with completion foreseen in 2023. The project was designed by Mario Cucinella Architects.

Description 

References

External links

Skyscrapers in Milan
Skyscraper office buildings in Italy